Antoine Fauré (24 December 1883 – 9 September 1954) was a French road bicycle racer. He rode the Tour de France two times in 1909 and 1912. He only finished in 1909, when he came 37th.

References

French male cyclists
1883 births
1954 deaths
Cyclists from Lyon